"Indiana"  is a single by Polish singer Sarsa. The song was released as the second single from her debut studio album Zapomnij mi on 14 August 2015, and was written by Sarsa with production by Sarsa along with Tomasz Konfederak.

The single reached number 1 on the Polish Airplay – New Chart and was certified gold.

Music video 
A music video to accompany the release of "Indiana" was released on 13 August 2015 through Sarsa's Vevo channel. It was directed by Alan Kępski.

Track listing

Charts and certifications

Weekly charts

Certifications

Release history

References

2015 songs
2015 singles
Sarsa (singer) songs
Universal Music Group singles
Polish-language songs